WIMM may refer to:

 The ICAO code for Kuala Namu International Airport
 WIMM-LP, a low-power radio station (107.7 FM) licensed to Owensboro, Kentucky, United States
 Where is My Mind?, a 1988 song by American alternative rock band Pixies
 WIMM One, a wearable computing device by Wimm Labs